ETM1 is a gene associated with essential tremor.

References